Cure53 is a German cybersecurity firm. The company was founded by Dr. Mario Heidrich, a client side security researcher.

After a report from Cure53 on the South Korean security app Smart Sheriff, that described the app's security holes as "catastrophic", the South Korean government ordered the Smart Sheriff to be shut down.

References

External links 

 Homepage
Linkedin
GitHub
Twitter

Computer security
Information technology companies of Germany
Companies based in Berlin